This list of computer-related awards is an index to articles about notable awards given for computer-related work. It excludes computer science awards and competitions, video game awards and web awards, which are covered by separate lists.

Hardware

Open source / freeware / shareware

Security

Programming

Applications

Scholarship

Other

See also

 Lists of awards
 List of computer science awards
 Lists of science and technology awards
 List of engineering awards

References

 
Computer-related